Your Job In Germany is a short film made for the United States War Department in 1945 just before Victory in Europe Day (VE). It was shown to US soldiers about to go on occupation duty in Germany. The film was made by the military film unit commanded by Frank Capra and was written by Theodor Geisel, better known by his pen name Dr. Seuss.

Content 

The film was produced by the US Army Signal Corps. It was criticized by one commentator as a "bitter and angry anti-German propaganda film" that characterized the post-war German mind as "diseased".

The film urged against fraternization with the German people, who are portrayed as thoroughly untrustworthy. It reminds its viewers of Germany's history of aggression, under "Fuehrer Number 1" Otto von Bismarck, "Fuehrer Number 2" Kaiser Wilhelm II and "Fuehrer Number 3" Adolf Hitler. It argues that the German youth are especially dangerous because they had spent their entire lives under the Nazi regime.

The policy of non-fraternisationwhere US soldiers were forbidden to speak even to small childrenwas first announced to the soldiers in the film:

The basic theme that the German people could not be trusted derived from the peace policy that emerged from the Second Quebec Conference.

The movie was first screened to the top US generals, including Dwight D. Eisenhower. George Patton reportedly walked out of the screening he attended, saying "Bullshit!".

Hitler Lives? 
Jack Warner, head of Warner Brothers, subsequently secured the rights to the movie and turned it into a short documentary entitled Hitler Lives. It was released commercially on December 29, 1945, and won the 1946 Academy Award (Oscar) for Documentary Short Subject.

In popular culture 
Numerous sentences from the film's narration are incorporated verbatim as lyrics in the single "Don't Argue" by Cabaret Voltaire from their album Code.

See also 
 Our Job in Japan, a companion film to Your Job In Germany also written by Geisel
 Here Is Germany
 Death Mills
 List of Allied propaganda films of World War II
 Sonderweg

References

External links 
 
 
 Online version of film at Der Spiegel website.

1945 films
American World War II propaganda shorts
United States Department of War
Anti-German sentiment in the United States
Films with screenplays by Dr. Seuss
Germany–United States relations
Articles containing video clips
American black-and-white films
Films directed by Frank Capra
American war films
1940s war films
American documentary films
1945 documentary films
1940s American films